Methavigal is a 1955 Indian Tamil-language film directed by K. Vembu. The film stars T. R. Ramachandran, M. N. Rajam and K.A. Thangavelu.

Cast
List adapted from the database of Film News Anandan.

Male cast
T. R. Ramachandran
K.A. Thangavelu
T. K. Balachandran
M. N. Kannappa
T. N. Sivathanu

Female cast
M. N. Rajam
P. K. Saraswathi
S. D. Subbulakshmi
D. K. Pattammal

Production
The film was produced by V. S. Raghavan under the banner of Revathi Productions and directed by K. Vembu. Pattu wrote the story and the dialogues. W. F. Khan and V. S. Rajan were in charge of cinematography and editing respectively. The film's post-production works were done at Modern Cine Lab and Tamil Nadu Talkies.

References

1955 films
1950s Tamil-language films
Indian drama films
Indian black-and-white films
1955 drama films